Rabiega is a surname. Notable people with the surname include:

 Robert Rabiega (born 1971), German chess grandmaster
 Vincent Rabiega (born 1995), Polish footballer